Jonapur is a census town in South district in the Indian state of Delhi.

Demographics
 India census, Jonapur had a population of 7,419. Males constitute 57% of the population and females 43%. Jonapur has an average literacy rate of 62%, higher than the national average of 59.5% male literacy is 70%, and female literacy is 51%. In Jonapur, 16% of the population is under 0–6 years of age.

References

External links
 Image of Jonapur

Cities and towns in South Delhi district